Mmabatho (Tswana for "Mother of the People") is the former capital of the North-West Province of South Africa. During the apartheid era, it was the capital of the former "Bantustan" of Bophuthatswana. Following the end of apartheid in 1994, Bophuthatswana was integrated into the newly established North-West Province and Mmabatho was proclaimed the provincial capital. However, Mmabatho's status as the provincial capital was short-lived. Later in 1994, the North West provincial legislature voted to rename the capital to Mahikeng (the town of Mafikeng having been merged with Mmabatho in 1980 and treated as a suburb of Mmabatho between 1980 and 1994), reducing Mmabatho to a suburb of Mafikeng.
  
Mmabatho contains many provincial government buildings, a shopping complex called Mega City and a Sports Stadium formerly called the Independence Stadium. The North-West University, formerly the University of Bophuthatswana, is located in Mmabatho.

Situated just south of the Botswana border, the town is connected by main roads to South Africa's national capital of Pretoria in the east and to Gaborone, the capital of Botswana, in the north. A railway runs north and south from the neighbouring town of Mafikeng. The city is served by Mmabatho International Airport, handling flights to and from Johannesburg.

References

Mahikeng
Capitals of former nations